Cheshmeh Hajegah may refer to:
 Cheshmeh Hajegah Jafari
 Cheshmeh Hajegah Shirzadi